Hoploparia benedeni is a species of fossil lobster found in Cretaceous rocks in northern France. It was first described in 1886 by Paul Pelseneer.

Stratigraphy and taxonomy
The type specimen was discovered in 1868 near Grandpré, Ardennes, France, and collected by M. F. L. Cornet. It was found in a phosphatic nodule in greensand deposits of Albian age.

The species was originally described by Paul Pelseneer in an 1886 article in the Bulletin du Musée royal d'histoire naturelle de Belgique, entitled "" ("Report of a crustacean from the green sands of Grandpré"). The specific epithet commemorates Professor Pierre-Joseph van Beneden, who donated the specimen to Pelseneer for study.

Description
The specimen is nearly complete. The tail fan (telson and uropods) and many of the thoracic appendages are not visible, but two large claws are well preserved. Since the proportions of lobsters change little as they grow, it is impossible to say whether the specimen is a juvenile or an adult. Pelseneer originally placed the species in the genus Hoploparia, rather than the closely related genus Homarus, because the rostrum was not adorned with lateral spines. It was later considered part of the genus Homarus as the relationship between the two genera was reassessed, but has since been restored to Hoploparia.

References

True lobsters
Early Cretaceous crustaceans
Fossil taxa described in 1886
Fossils of France
Early Cretaceous arthropods of Europe
Cretaceous France
Albian species